During the 1993–94 season, Newcastle United participated in the FA Premier League for this first time.

Season summary
After four years in the First Division, Kevin Keegan's side were promoted to the Premiership as champions. The return of Peter Beardsley created a prolific striker partnership with the young Andy Cole, the pair scoring 55 goals between them in the Premiership. The club achieved a third-place finish in the league and UEFA Cup qualification - the club's first foray into Europe since the 1970s. Londoner Robert Lee, left footed midfielder Scott Sellers along with local youngsters Lee Clark and Steve Howey emerged as Premier League stars under Keegan's guidance. The team was nicknamed "The Entertainers" by the media, an indication of the style of play that Keegan instilled on the team. Cole also collected the PFA Young Player of the Year award, having scored a club record of 41 goals in all competitions. Beardsley also found the net 24 times in all competitions, meaning that the strike partnership of Cole and Beardsley had produced a total of 65 goals - the majority of the goals the team scored all season.

Post-season signings included World Cup stars Marc Hottiger and Philippe Albert, and Derby striker Paul Kitson.

A 7–1 win over Swindon Town matched Blackburn's record for the highest Premier League victory, which was set the previous season.

Final league table

Appearances, goals and cards
(Substitute appearances in brackets)

Coaching staff

Transfers

In

 Total spending:  £7.83m

Out

 Total income:  £4.14m

Loans in

Loans out

Competitions

Pre-season

League

FA Cup

League Cup

Matches

Pre-season

Premier League

FA Cup

League Cup

References

External links
FootballSquads - Newcastle United - 1993/94
Newcastle United Football Club - Fixtures 1993-94
Transfers (Keegan) - Senior / Reserve Arrivals & Departures
The Great career - Profile
Newcastle United 1993-1994 - statto.com
Player Index - premierleague.com
Season Details - 1993-94 - toon1892

Newcastle United F.C. seasons
Newcastle United